Bus spotting is the interest and activity of watching, photographing and tracking buses throughout their working service lives within bus companies. A person who engages in these activities is known as a bus spotter, bus fan, bus nut (colloquial British English) or bus enthusiast. 

There are many enthusiasts of the bus and coach industry across the globe. Like train and aircraft spotters, bus spotters activities include monitoring bus route allocations, sharing knowledge about buses and taking pictures of buses. Some may be so keen that they might track a vehicle through its life, knowing for example which fleet numbers it has carried with different owners and when mechanical parts or interior fittings were renewed. 

Since bus spotting involves urban mass transit, it often goes hand in hand with metrophily. In New York, the two are often combined into "transit fan", a person who studies both bus and rail rapid transit, with the same diligence. This practice is popular in the Greater Toronto And Hamilton Area in Canada.

There are a number of magazines aimed at bus enthusiasts and spotters, e.g. Buses Magazine.

Preservation of buses

Some bus spotters may list or trace the whereabouts of surviving retired vehicles from a particular operator to purchase them for preservation purposes. The preserved buses can then be taken out to be driven either on discontinued services or through a set route for an event.

Gallery

See also

Roadgeek
Railfan
Bus preservation in the United Kingdom

References

Bus terminology
Observation hobbies